Roald Dahl's Matilda the Musical, or simply Matilda the Musical, is a 2022 musical fantasy comedy drama film directed by Matthew Warchus from a screenplay by Dennis Kelly, based on the stage musical of the same name by Kelly and Tim Minchin, which in turn is based on the 1988 novel Matilda by Roald Dahl. The film, co-produced by TriStar Pictures, Working Title Films, and The Roald Dahl Story Company, is the second film adaptation of the novel, following the 1996 film (also produced by TriStar). The film stars Alisha Weir as the title character, alongside Lashana Lynch, Stephen Graham, Andrea Riseborough, Sindhu Vee, and Emma Thompson. In the film, Matilda Wormwood (Weir), who is neglected and mistreated by her parents (Graham and Riseborough), develops psychokinetic abilities to deal with Miss Trunchbull (Thompson), the ruthless and cruel headmistress of Crunchem Hall School.

A film adaptation of the stage musical was first announced in November 2013, with Warchus and Kelly reportedly attached to return as director and writer, respectively. In January 2020, the project was officially announced, and Warchus and Kelly's returns were confirmed, as well as Minchin, who revealed he was returning to write new songs for the film. Christopher Nightingale, who had written background music for the stage production, was also hired to return as composer of the film's incidental score. The cast was filled out between January and April 2021, including Weir, Lynch, Thompson, Vee, Graham and Riseborough. Filming took place beginning in May 2021.

Roald Dahl's Matilda the Musical premiered at the BFI London Film Festival on 5 October 2022, and was theatrically released in the United Kingdom on 25 November, by Sony Pictures Releasing International, while in the United States, it received a limited theatrical release on 9 December and was available on Netflix on 25 December. The film received positive reviews from critics and was nominated for Outstanding British Film and Best Makeup and Hair at the 76th British Academy Film Awards.

Plot

In a hospital, while other parents adore their newborn children, Mrs. Wormwood is distraught to learn she is pregnant and in labour. To her husband Mr. Wormwood's confusion, she gives birth to a girl, Matilda. Despite her parents' constant disdain, Matilda becomes a sweet child who loves reading and visits the librarian Mrs. Phelps daily. Upon discovering that Matilda has not been properly schooled, teacher Miss Jennifer Honey and an inspector visit the house to suggest Matilda be sent to Crunchem Hall. Angry about being fined for not sending his daughter to school, Mr. Wormwood warns the severe headmistress, Miss Agatha Trunchbull, about Matilda. Who sneaks into their room and tricks him into dyeing his hair 

Before school, Matilda tells Mrs. Phelps a story about an escapologist who falls in love with and marries an acrobat. Arriving at school, Matilda and her fellow new student Lavender are warned about the terrible way the students are treated there. In Honey's classroom, Matilda solves a complex mathematical equation on the board and confesses that she loves reading most. An impressed Honey asks Trunchbull to move Matilda to a more advanced class, but Trunchbull refuses to let Matilda be an exception to the rules. At home, when Matilda criticizes her father, he rips her book apart and wrongly sends her to bed; she retaliates again by gluing his hat to his head. The next day, Matilda leads the students in protecting classmate Nigel from wrongful punishment. But Trunchbull instead aims her towards Amanda Thripp and throws her over the fence.

During the students' lunch, Trunchbull falsely accuses Matilda of stealing a slice of her private chocolate cake, but Bruce Bogtrotter accidentally reveals he is the culprit by belching. Trunchbull forces him to eat the entire cake, saying he will be forgiven if he manages it. Bruce's success thrills Matilda, Honey, and the students. Furious that he suceeds, Trunchbull condemns him to the Chokey regardless. After school, Matilda returns to Mrs. Phelps and continues her story: the now-pregnant acrobat is forced to perform a dangerous stunt by her husband's stepsister; she is horribly injured and dies after giving birth to a daughter. The escapologist forgives the stepsister and asks her to help him raise his daughter. The stepsister blames the daughter for her stepsister's death and secretly terrorizes her. At home, after Mr. Wormwood locks Matilda in her room for 
. She ends her story: when the escapologist discovers his daughter is mistreated, he never returns from confronting the stepsister.

The next day, Trunchbull forces the children through challenging exercises to crush their rebelliousness. Lavender slips her pet newt into her drinking water, and Matilda uses her newly discovered telekinesis to embarrass Trunchbull. Honey invites Matilda to her cottage, where Matilda learns that the escapologist and the acrobat were Miss Honey's parents and the evil stepsister is Trunchbull. Despite Honey's warnings against getting in Trunchbull's way, Matilda uses her powers to destroy the Chokey. Returning home, Matilda learns that her father has cheated the mafia and the family will be moving to Spain, distressing Matilda.

When the children return to school, Trunchbull, having learned about the destruction of the Chokey, forces Honey's class to spell words correctly or be locked in a new Chokey. She has Lavender spell a made-up word, tricking the other children into purposefully spelling words incorrectly in rebellion so that she can lock them all into Chokeys. Matilda uses her telekinesis to pretend to be the vengeful ghost of Honey's father, then destroys all the Chokeys and throws Trunchbull out of the school. Honey tells Trunchbull never to return and takes back the keys to her father's house. After Trunchbull runs away, the students openly revolt and destroy Trunchbull's statue. Mr and Mrs Wormwood come to take Matilda to Spain with them, but Honey pleads with them to let Matilda stay with her. They reluctantly agree to let her adopt Matilda, who uses her powers to unglue her father's hat.

With Miss Honey as the new headmistress, the students rename Crunchem Hall The Big Friendly School and renovate the school. When Matilda finishes her story for Mrs Phelps, she is overjoyed that Matilda's true story has a happy ending, in which Matilda and Miss Honey live happily together.

Cast

Production

Development

On 15 November 2013, it was reported that Matthew Warchus and Dennis Kelly, director and writer, respectively, for the musical Matilda the Musical, based on Roald Dahl's novel Matilda, would return for a film adaptation. In June 2016, Tim Minchin confirmed that a film adaptation of Matilda the Musical was in development, which he said "will probably be made in the next 4 or 5 years". Mara Wilson, who previously starred in the 1996 film adaptation of the novel directed by Danny DeVito, said, "Maybe if they made it into a movie, I could have a cameo, but that's for them to decide." On 27 November 2018, Netflix was revealed to be adapting Matilda as an animated series, which would be part of an "animated event series" along with other Roald Dahl books such as The BFG, The Twits, and Charlie and the Chocolate Factory. In November 2019, DeVito said that he "always wanted to" develop a sequel to Matilda, adding that a potential sequel could star Matilda's own child, due to Wilson having aged in the time since. On 28 January 2020, it was reported that Working Title Films would produce, while Netflix will distribute via streaming, and Sony Pictures Releasing, who previously distributed the 1996 film through its TriStar Pictures banner, would handle theatrical and home video exclusively in the UK through the same banner. It was also confirmed that Warchus and Kelly were still involved with the project. Ellen Kane, who worked with choreographer Peter Darling on the stage production, would choreograph.

Casting

On 4 May 2020, it was reported that Ralph Fiennes was cast as Miss Trunchbull (the role has conventionally been portrayed on stage by male actors). However, later on 14 January 2021, it was announced that Emma Thompson would play the character instead, with additional confirmations that Lashana Lynch was cast as Miss Honey and Alisha Weir was cast in the title role, after giving what Warchus called "an unforgettable audition." Over 200 children were cast as the rest of the student body of Crunchem Hall. In April 2021 it was announced that Stephen Graham, Andrea Riseborough and Sindhu Vee would be joining the cast as Mr Wormwood, Mrs Wormwood and Mrs Phelps, respectively.

Filming
Production was originally planned between August and December 2020, however, this was postponed to spring 2021 due to the COVID-19 pandemic. Filming primarily took place at Shepperton Studios in Surrey, with locations including Bramshill House, a Grade I-listed Jacobean manor in Hampshire for Crunchem Hall; and Denham in Buckinghamshire, for scenes set in Matilda's home village. Some production is also listed as having taken place in Ireland.

Music

On 15 November 2013, Minchin, who previously wrote songs for the musical, was in talks to create new songs for the film, and in 2020, he was confirmed to do so. Christopher Nightingale composed original incidental music to underscore the film, just as he did onstage.

The film's soundtrack album, containing both the songs and Nightingale's score, was released worldwide on 18 November 2022 digitally and 9 December 2022 on physical CD, by Milan Records.

Musical numbers 

 "Miracle" – Doctor, Mrs Wormwood, Mr Wormwood, Matilda and Company
 "Naughty" – Matilda
 "School Song" – Hortensia, Prefects and Children
 "The Hammer" – Miss Trunchbull, Children and Miss Honey
 "Naughty" (reprise) '''' – Matilda
 "Chokey Chant" – Children
 "Bruce" – Children
 "When I Grow Up" – Children, Miss Honey and Matilda
 "I'm Here" – Matilda and The Escapologist
 "The Smell of Rebellion" – Miss Trunchbull
 "Quiet" – Matilda
 "My House" – Miss Honey and The Escapologist
 "Revolting Children" – Bruce, Hortensia and Children
 "Still Holding My Hand" – Miss Honey, Matilda, Children and Company

ReleaseMatilda the Musical had its world premiere at the BFI London Film Festival on 5 October 2022, and was released in the United Kingdom by Sony Pictures Releasing International, on 25 November 2022. The film received a limited theatrical release in the United States and internationally on 9 December 2022, before streaming on Netflix on Christmas Day 2022. Sony Pictures and Netflix will oversee home media releases in the United Kingdom, set for Summer 2023.

A sing-along edition opened across United Kingdom cinemas for a limited time starting on New Year's Day 2023; a preview screening was shown on 17 December 2022, in aid of MediCinema. This version began in the United States on 6 January 2023.

Box office
In its opening weekend, 25 November 2022, Matilda topped the UK box office with a gross of $5,000,505, beating the previous two weeks' holder Black Panther: Wakanda Forever.  Matilda remained at the top of the UK box office for three consecutive weeks, until being overtaken by  Avatar: The Way Of Water following its release on 16 December 2022. 

As of 27 February 2023, the film has earned $33,205,743 in the United Kingdom.  Matilda was the 4th highest grossing family friendly movie (Rated PG / U) to have been released in the United Kingdom in 2022. Matilda earned a total gross of $22,687,857 during 2022, respectfully behind: Minions: The Rise of Gru earning 1st place with a total gross $56,024,097 in 2022 (Released 1 July 2022), Sing 2 placed second with a $44,133,615 total gross (Released 28 January 2022), and Sonic The Hedgehog 2 placing third with a $34,684,230 total gross (Released 1 April 2022). The Bad Guys placed further behind Matilda in 5th place with a total gross of $17,620,330 (Released 2 April 2022), and DC League of Super-Pets placing 6th with a $17,473,842 total gross (Released 29 July 2022). 

Critical reception
 Metacritic assigned the film a weighted average score of 72 out of 100 based on 28 critics, indicating "generally favorable reviews". Robbie Collin of The Telegraph wrote Thompson's portrayal of Trunchbull is "a deranged villain to remember". The Guardian critic Peter Bradshaw stated "the gleefully sly comedy kindred spirits of Thompson and Minchin come together to form the film's bedrock of naughtiness". Matt Patches of Polygon'' named the "Revolting Children" sequence as one of the best movie scenes of the year. Avinash Ramachandran of Cinema Express called it a "fantastical reboot of a beloved classic."

References

External links

 
 

2022 films
2022 comedy films
2022 fantasy films
2020s American films
2020s British films
2020s children's comedy films
2020s children's fantasy films
2020s English-language films
2020s fantasy comedy films
2020s musical comedy films
American children's comedy films
American children's fantasy films
American fantasy comedy films
American musical comedy films
British children's comedy films
British children's fantasy films
British fantasy comedy films
British musical comedy films
Comedy film remakes
Fantasy film remakes
Film productions suspended due to the COVID-19 pandemic
Films about child abuse
Films about dysfunctional families
Films about friendship
Films about teacher–student relationships
Films about telekinesis
Films based on adaptations
Films based on children's books
Films based on musicals
Films based on works by Roald Dahl
Films shot at Shepperton Studios
Films shot in Ireland
Film
Musical film remakes
TriStar Pictures films
Films set in the 1980s